Maben Hill is a mountain located in Greene County, New York east-southeast of Prattsville, New York. Maben Hill is located south of Patterson Ridge. It drains south and east into Schoharie Creek.

References

Mountains of Greene County, New York
Mountains of New York (state)